Below is a partial list of minor league baseball players in the Kansas City Royals system.

Players

CJ Alexander

Charles Joseph Wesley Alexander (born July 17, 1996) is an American professional baseball third baseman for the Kansas City Royals organization.

Alexander attended Bishop Verot High School in Fort Myers, Florida. He signed a National Letter of Intent with Ball State University to play college baseball for the Ball State Cardinals. He transferred to the State College of Florida, Manatee–Sarasota before committing to transfer to the University of Central Florida. The Atlanta Braves selected Alexander in the 20th round of the 2018 MLB draft.

On July 11, 2022, the Braves traded Alexander, Drew Waters, and Andrew Hoffmann to the Kansas City Royals for the 35th overall selection of the 2022 MLB draft.

Alexander's brother, Blaze, is also a baseball player.

Tucker Bradley

Tucker Wade Bradley (born May 6, 1998) is an American professional baseball outfielder in the Kansas City Royals organization.

Bradley attended Gordon Lee High School in Chickamauga, Georgia. As a senior in 2016, he batted .552 with nine home runs, 36 RBIs, 23 stolen bases, and 12 doubles alongside pitching to a 1.12 ERA over fifty innings and was named the Walker County Player of the Year. He signed to play college baseball at Auburn University, but later switched his commitment to the University of Georgia.

As a freshman at Georgia in 2017, Bradley started 41 games and hit .314 with ten RBIs. For the 2018 season, he started 53 games and batted .300 with three home runs and 26 RBIs. He played three games in 2019 before injuring his shoulder and missing the remainder of the season. Bradley played 18 games in 2020 in which he batted .397 with six home runs and 23 RBIs before the season was cancelled due to the COVID-19 pandemic. He went unselected in the shortened 2020 Major League Baseball draft and signed with the Kansas City Royals as an undrafted free agent.

Bradley made his professional debut in 2021 with the Columbia Fireflies  and was promoted to the Quad Cities River Bandits in mid-May. Over 94 games, he batted .285 with six home runs, 45 RBIs, and 12 stolen bases. He played the 2022 season with the Northwest Arkansas Naturals. Over 110 games, he slashed .293/.382/.455 with 12 home runs, 53 RBIs, and 19 stolen bases.

Georgia Bulldogs bio

Jonathan Bowlan

Jonathan Bowlan (born December 1, 1996) is an American professional baseball pitcher in the Kansas City Royals organization.

Bowlan attended Bartlett High School in Bartlett, Tennessee and played college baseball at the University of Memphis. He was drafted by the Kansas City Royals in the second round of the 2018 Major League Baseball draft.

Bowlan made his professional debut with the Idaho Falls Chukars, going 1-4 with a 6.94 ERA over 35 innings. He started 2019 with the Lexington Legends and was promoted to the Wilmington Blue Rocks during the season. Pitching for Wilmington in July, he threw a no-hitter against the Carolina Mudcats. Over 26 games (23 starts) between the two teams, Bowlan went 11-5 with a 3.14 ERA and 150 strikeouts over 146 innings. He did not play a game in 2020 due to the cancellation of the minor league season, and appeared in only four games in 2021 due undergoing Tommy John surgery in May. Bowlan was added to the 40-man roster following the season on November 19, 2021.

Bowlan was optioned to the Double-A Northwest Arkansas Naturals to begin the 2023 season.

Chandler Champlain

Chandler Jay Champlain (born July 23, 1999) is an American professional baseball pitcher for the Kansas City Royals.

Champlain attended Santa Margarita Catholic High School in Rancho Santa Margarita, California. The Los Angeles Angels selected Champlain in the 38th round of the 2019 MLB draft, but he did not sign a contract with the Angels. He enrolled at the University of Southern California (USC) and played college baseball for the USC Trojans.

The New York Yankees selected Champlain in the ninth round of the 2021 MLB draft. On July 27, 2022, the Yankees traded Champlain, T. J. Sikkema, and Beck Way to the Kansas City Royals for Andrew Benintendi.

Champlain's father, Jay, played for USC's football team as a wide receiver, and his mother Robyn, is a former competitive downhill skier.

Austin Cox

Austin Cox (born March 28, 1997) is an American professional baseball pitcher in the Kansas City Royals organization.

Cox attended First Presbyterian Day School in Macon, Georgia, where he played baseball and football. For his high school career, he went 15–6 with a 2.19 ERA. Undrafted in the 2015 Major League Baseball draft, he fulfilled his commitment to play college baseball at Mercer University.

In 2016, Cox's freshman year at Mercer, he pitched 24 innings, compiling a 2–2 record and a 10.13 ERA. As a sophomore in 2016, he started 15 games, going 4–2 with a 5.69 ERA. In 2018, his junior season, he was named Mercer's Friday night starter. Over 17 starts, Cox pitched to a 7–4 record with a 4.52 ERA, striking out 124 batters over  innings. After the season, he was selected by the Kansas City Royals in the fifth round of the 2018 Major League Baseball draft.

Cox signed with the Royals and made his professional debut with the Burlington Royals of the Rookie-level Appalachian League, pitching to a 1–1 record and a 3.78 ERA over nine starts. In 2019, he began the year with the Lexington Legends of the Class A South Atlantic League, with whom he was named an All-Star alongside earning Pitcher of the Week honors in early June. He was promoted to the Wilmington Blue Rocks of the Class A-Advanced Carolina League in June, and finished the season there. Over 24 games (23 starts) between the two teams, he went 8–6 with a 2.76 ERA, compiling 129 strikeouts and 38 walks over  innings. He did not play a minor league game in 2020 since the season was cancelled due to the COVID-19 pandemic. To begin the 2021 season, he was assigned to the Northwest Arkansas Naturals of the Double-A Central, and was promoted to the Omaha Storm Chasers of the Triple-A East in late September. Over 17 games (16 starts) between the two clubs, Cox went 4-1 with a 4.10 ERA and 56 strikeouts over 63 innings. He returned to Omaha for the 2022 season. Over 29 games (24 starts), he went 7-7 with a 4.21 ERA and 105 strikeouts over  innings.

Clay Dungan

Anthony Clay Dungan (born June 2, 1996) is an American professional baseball infielder in the Kansas City Royals organization.

Dungan attended Yorktown High School in Yorktown, Indiana, where played baseball. He batted .488 with 13 steals as a senior in 2015. After graduating, he enrolled at Indiana State University where he played college baseball and batted .305 with nine home runs, 38 RBIs, and ten doubles over 61 starts as a senior in 2019. He was selected by the Kansas City Royals in the ninth round of the 2019 Major League Baseball draft.

Dungan signed with the Royals and made his professional debut with the Idaho Falls Chukars with whom he was named an All-Star. Over 65 games, he hit .357 with two home runs, 38 RBIs, and 19 doubles. He did not play a game in 2020 due to the cancellation of the minor league season. In 2021, he played with the Northwest Arkansas Naturals and slashed .288/.357/.405 with nine home runs, 56 RBIs, and 28 stolen bases over 108 games. He was assigned to the Omaha Storm Chasers for the 2022 season. Over 127 games, he compiled a .208/.294/.334 slash line with nine home runs, 52 RBIs, and 17 stolen bases.

Indiana State Sycamores bio

Josh Dye

Joshua Dye (born September 14, 1996) is an American professional baseball pitcher in the Kansas City Royals organization.

Dye attended DeLand High School in DeLand, Florida, where he helps guide the Bulldogs to the Class 8A semifinals as a senior in 2014. He went unselected in the 2014 Major League Baseball draft and enrolled at Florida Gulf Coast University where he played college baseball. He underwent elbow surgery after his freshman year in 2015, where he posted a 3.70 ERA over  innings. After not pitching in 2016, he returned from the injury in 2017, starting 16 games and going 8-5 with a 3.23 ERA and 76 strikeouts over  innings. For the 2018 season, he started 14 games and went 8-4 with a 2.40 ERA. Following the season's end, he was selected by the Kansas City Royals in the 23rd round of the 2018 Major League Baseball draft.

Dye signed with the Royals for $60,000, and made his professional debut with the Burlington Royals before he was promoted to the Wilmington Blue Rocks. Over 12 games (eight starts) between the two teams, he went 2-3 with a 4.20 ERA and forty strikeouts over  innings. Dye split the 2019 season between the Lexington Legends and Wilmington and went 5-3 with a 2.15 ERA and 81 strikeouts over  innings pitched in relief. He did not play a game in 2020 due to the cancellation of the minor league season. He split the 2021 season between the Northwest Arkansas Naturals and the Omaha Storm Chasers, making forty relief appearances and compiling a 4-2 record, a 2.60 ERA, and 73 strikeouts over  innings between the two teams. He returned to Omaha for the 2022 season. Over 48 games (six starts), he went 5-3 with a 4.48 ERA and 58 strikeouts over  innings.

Florida Gulf Coast bio

Tyler Gentry

Tyler Jackson Gentry (born February 1, 1999) is an American professional baseball outfielder in the Kansas City Royals organization.

Gentry attended Arlington High School in Arlington, Tennessee, where he played baseball. As a junior in 2016, he batted .341 with 33 RBIs. As a senior in 2017, he earned all-state honors. He went unselected in the 2017 Major League Baseball draft, and enrolled at Walters State Community College where he played one season of college baseball.

During Gentry's first and only season at Walters State in 2018, he batted .379 with 18 home runs over 64 games. Following the season's end, he transferred to the University of Alabama where he played for the Alabama Crimson Tide baseball team. Over 56 games in 2019 with the Crimson Tide, Gentry hit .310 with a team-high 13 home runs, 42 RBIs, and 37 runs scored. That summer, he played in the Cape Cod Baseball League with the Brewster Whitecaps where he was named a league all-star. During his junior season in 2020, he batted .429 over 17 games before the season was cancelled due to the COVID-19 pandemic. He was selected by the Kansas City Royals in the third round with the 76th overall selection of the 2020 Major League Baseball draft. He signed for $750,000.

Gentry made his professional debut in 2021 with the Quad Cities River Bandits. His season ended in mid-July due to knee injuries. Over 44 games prior to the injury, he batted .259 with six home runs and 28 RBIs. He opened the 2022 season with Quad Cities and was promoted to the Northwest Arkansas Naturals in early June. Over 108 games between the two teams, he slashed .326/.422/.542 with 21 home runs, 86 RBIs, 22 doubles, and ten stolen bases. He was selected to play in the Arizona Fall League for the Surprise Saguaros after the season.

Alabama Crimson Tide bio

Diego Hernández

Diego Hernández (born November 21, 2000) is a Dominican professional baseball outfielder in the Kansas City Royals organization.

Hernández signed with the Kansas City Royals as an international free agent in July 2017. He made his professional debut in 2018 with the Dominican Summer League Royals.

The Royals added him to their 40-man roster after the 2022 season.

On February 25, 2023, Hernández suffered a dislocation in his right shoulder while attempting a diving catch during a spring training game. The next day, it was announced he would miss three-to-four months with the injury. He was later optioned to the Double-A Northwest Arkansas Naturals on March 10.

Andrew Hoffmann

Andrew Michael Hoffmann (born February 2, 2000) is an American professional baseball pitcher in the Kansas City Royals organization.

Hoffman attended Plainfield East High School in Plainfield, Illinois and played college baseball at Oakland University, John A. Logan College and the University of Illinois Urbana-Champaign. He was drafted by the Atlanta Braves in the 12th round of the 2021 Major League Baseball draft.

Hoffman made his professional debut with the Augusta GreenJackets and started 2022 with the Rome Braves. On July 11, 2022, the Braves traded Hoffmann, Drew Waters, and CJ Alexander to the Kansas City Royals for the 35th overall selection of the 2022 MLB draft.

Will Klein

William Boone Klein (born November 28, 1999) is an American professional baseball pitcher in the Kansas City Royals organization.

Klein attended Bloomington High School North in Bloomington, Indiana. As a senior in 2017, he pitched only  innings after breaking his thumb, but still struck out thirty batters and compiled a 1.98 ERA. Unselected in the 2017 Major League Baseball draft, he enrolled at Eastern Illinois University where he posted a 6.62 ERA over  innings as a freshman, a 5.11 ERA over  innings as a sophomore, and a 3.33 ERA with 33 strikeouts as a junior in 2020 before the season was cancelled due to the COVID-19 pandemic. He was selected by the Kansas City Royals in the fifth round with the 135th overall pick of the 2020 Major League Baseball draft. He signed for $200,000.

Klein made his professional debut in 2021 with the Quad Cities River Bandits of the High-A Central. Over 36 relief appearances, he went 7-1 with a 3.20 ERA, 121 strikeouts, and 44 walks over  innings pitched. MLB Pipeline named Klein the Royals' Pitching Prospect of the Year following the season's end. He missed the beginning of the 2022 season due to shin splints. He returned to play in mid-May with the Northwest Arkansas Naturals of the Double-A Texas League as a member of their starting rotation, but was later moved to the bullpen. Over thirty games (three starts), he went 1-1 with a 10.51 ERA, 55 strikeouts, and 51 walks over  innings.

Eastern Illinois bio

Ben Kudrna

Benjamin Michael Kudrna (born January 30, 2003) is an American professional baseball pitcher in the Kansas City Royals organization.

Kudrna grew up in Overland Park, Kansas and attended Blue Valley Southwest High School. As a senior, Kudrna was named the Gatorade Kansas Baseball Player of the Year and the Class 5A Pitcher of the Year after he went 9-1 on the mound with a 0.99 ERA and 100 strikeouts and 11 walks in  innings pitched. Kudrna committed to play college baseball at Louisiana State prior to signing with the Royals.

Kudrna was selected in the 2nd round of the 2021 MLB draft by the Kansas City Royals. He signed with the team on July 19, 2021, and received a $3 million signing bonus. Kudrna began the 2022 season in extended spring training before being assigned to the Columbia Fireflies of the Single-A Carolina League.

Alec Marsh

Alec Tylar Michael Marsh (born May 14, 1998) is an American professional baseball pitcher in the Kansas City Royals organization.

Marsh was born and grew up in Milwaukee, Wisconsin and attended Ronald Wilson Reagan College Preparatory High School.

Marsh played college baseball for the Arizona State Sun Devils for three seasons. As a freshman, he appeared in 11 games with one start and had an 8.14 ERA. In 2018, he played collegiate summer baseball with the Yarmouth–Dennis Red Sox of the Cape Cod Baseball League. Marsh became a starter during his sophomore season and went 3-3 with a 3.89 ERA. He was named first team All-Pac-12 Conference after going 9-4 over 17 starts with a 3.46 ERA on the mound and 99 strikeouts in  innings pitched.

Marsh was selected in the Competitive Balance section of second round of the 2019 Major League Baseball draft by the Kansas City Royals. He signed with the team he was assigned to the Idaho Falls Chukars of the Pioneer League, where he started 13 games and posted a 4.05 ERA in  innings pitched. After the 2020 minor league season was canceled, Marsh played in the temporary independent Constellation Energy League for the Eastern Reyes del Tigre. Marsh was named to the Royals' 2021 Spring Training roster as a non-roster invitee. He was assigned to the Northwest Arkansas Naturals, but pitched only  innings due to injury. In 2022 in the minor leagues he was 2-16 with a 6.88 ERA in 27 starts, and led the minor leagues in losses.

Marsh was assigned to Double-A Northwest Arkansas to begin the 2023 season.

Arizona State Sun Devils bio

Seuly Matias

Seuly Matias (born September 4, 1998) is a Dominican professional baseball outfielder in the Kansas City Royals organization.

Matias signed with the Kansas City Royals as an international free agent in July 2015. He spent his first professional season in 2016 with the Dominican Summer League Royals and Arizona League Royals, batting a combined .235/.333/.439 with eight home runs and 31 RBIs in 53 total games between both clubs.

In 2017, Matias played for the Burlington Royals where he hit .243 with seven home runs and 36 RBIs in 57 games, and in 2018 he played with the Lexington Legends where he batted .231 with 31 home runs and 63 RBIs in 94 games, earning South Atlantic League All-Star honors.

Matias spent 2019 with the Wilmington Blue Rocks, but missed time due to injury; over 54 games, he hit .148 with four home runs and 22 RBIs. He elected free agency on November 10, 2022. He re-signed a minor league deal on December 14, 2022.

Evan Sisk

Samuel Evan Sisk (born April 23, 1997) is an American professional baseball pitcher in the Kansas City Royals organization.

Sisk attended Lewisville High School in Richburg, South Carolina and played college baseball at the College of Charleston. As a junior in 2018, he went 10-3 with a 2.96 ERA over  innings. After his junior season, he was selected by the St. Louis Cardinals in the 16th round of the 2018 Major League Baseball draft.

Sisk signed with the Cardinals and made his professional debut with the Johnson City Cardinals, posting a 1.76 ERA over  innings. He spent the 2019 season with the Peoria Chiefs where he went 3-6 with a 3.25 ERA over 61 innings pitched in relief. He did not play a game in 2020 due to the cancellation of the minor league season. He opened the 2021 season with Peoria and was promoted to the Springfield Cardinals during the season.

On July 30, 2021, the Cardinals traded Sisk and John Gant to the Minnesota Twins in exchange for J.A. Happ and cash. He was assigned to the Wichita Wind Surge where he finished the season. Over 39 relief appearances between Peoria, Springfield and Wichita, he went 3-1 with a 3.91 ERA and 69 strikeouts over 53 innings. After the season, he played in the Arizona Fall League for the Scottsdale Scorpions. He opened the 2022 season with Wichita and was promoted to the St. Paul Saints in mid-June. Over fifty relief appearances between the two teams, he went 5-1 with a 1.57 ERA and 76 strikeouts over 63 innings.

On January 23, 2023, Sisk was traded to the Kansas City Royals alongside Steven Cruz in exchange for Michael A. Taylor.

College of Charleston bio

Samad Taylor

Samad Jahad Taylor (born July 11, 1998) is an American professional baseball second baseman in the Kansas City Royals organization.

Taylor attended Corona High School in his hometown of Corona, California. He committed to play college baseball for the Arizona Wildcats. He was selected in the 10th round of the 2016 Major League Baseball draft by the Cleveland Indians, signed, and was assigned to the Rookie-level Arizona League Indians after signing. In 32 games, Taylor recorded a .293 batting average, one home run, and 14 runs batted in (RBI). He was assigned to the Short Season-A Mahoning Valley Scrappers to begin the 2017 season. On July 31, the Indians traded Taylor and Thomas Pannone to the Toronto Blue Jays for reliever Joe Smith. The Blue Jays assigned Taylor to the Rookie Advanced Bluefield Blue Jays for five games before promoting him to the Short Season-A Vancouver Canadians for the remainder of the season. In 54 total games played in 2017, Taylor hit .294 with six home runs and 30 RBI.

Taylor was assigned to the Class-A Lansing Lugnuts for the 2018 season. In 121 games, he batted .228 with nine home runs, 53 RBI, and 44 stolen bases. He was promoted to the Advanced-A Dunedin Blue Jays in 2019, where he appeared in 108 games and hit .216 with seven home runs, 38 RBI, and 26 steals. During the COVID-19 pandemic-cancelled 2020 season, Taylor played 25 games for the Canberra Cavalry of the Australian Baseball League. He played the entire 2021 season for the Double-A New Hampshire Fisher Cats, batting .294 with 16 home runs, 52 RBI, and 30 stolen bases in 87 games, and was named a MiLB.com Organization All-Star. Taylor played with the Tigres del Licey of the Dominican Winter League during the offseason, and was assigned to the Triple-A Buffalo Bisons to begin 2022.

On August 2, 2022, Taylor and Max Castillo were traded to the Kansas City Royals in exchange for Whit Merrifield. Taylor was optioned to the Triple-A Omaha Storm Chasers to begin the 2023 season.

Luca Tresh

Luca Tresh (born January 11, 2000) is an American professional baseball catcher in the Kansas City Royals organization.

Tresh attended Clearwater Central Catholic High School in Clearwater, Florida and played college baseball at NC State University. He was drafted by the Kansas City Royals in the 17th round of the 2021 Major League Baseball draft.

Tresh played his first professional season in 2021 with the Arizona Complex League Royals and Columbia Fireflies. After the season, he played in the Arizona Fall League. He started 2022 with the Quad Cities River Bandits before his promotion to the Northwest Arkansas Naturals.

Beck Way

Beck Michael Way (born August 6, 1999) is an American professional baseball pitcher in the Kansas City Royals organization.

Way attended Cumberland Valley High School in Mechanicsburg, Pennsylvania and played college baseball at Belmont Abbey College and Northwest Florida State College. In 2019, he played collegiate summer baseball with the Cotuit Kettleers of the Cape Cod Baseball League. He was drafted by the New York Yankees in the fourth round of the 2020 Major League Baseball draft.

Way played his first professional season in 2021 with the Tampa Tarpons and Hudson Valley Renegades. He started 2022 with Hudson Valley.

On July 27, 2022, the Yankees traded Way, T. J. Sikkema, and Chandler Champlain to the Kansas City Royals for Andrew Benintendi.

Peyton Wilson

Peyton Thomas Wilson (born November 1, 1999) is an American baseball second baseman in the Kansas City Royals organization. He played college baseball for the Alabama Crimson Tide.

Wilson grew up in Hoover, Alabama and attended Hoover High School. He committed to play college baseball at Alabama after his sophomore year. Wilson also played football at Hoover until giving up the sport as a junior to focus on baseball.

Wilson played both catcher and center field as a true freshman for the Alabama Crimson Tide and batted .333 over ten games before the season was cut short due to the COVID-19 pandemic. He moved to second base as a sophomore and was named second team All-Southeastern Conference after batting .290 while leading the Crimson Tide with 72 hits and 46 runs scored while also hitting 13 doubles, a triple and nine home runs with 31 RBIs.

Wilson was selected in the second round with the 66th overall pick in the 2021 Major League Baseball draft by the Kansas City Royals. He signed with the team on July 24, 2021, and received a $1,003,300 signing bonus. Wilson began his professional career with the Arizona Complex League Royals before being promoted to the Columbia Fireflies. Wilson began the 2022 season on the injured list before being assigned to the High-A Quad Cities River Bandits.

Wilson's older brother, John Parker Wilson, played quarterback for Alabama and in the National Football League. Another brother, Ross, played baseball at Alabama and in the Chicago White Sox, Miami Marlins, and Atlanta Braves organizations.

Alabama Crimson Tide bio

Full Triple-A to Rookie League rosters

Triple-A (Omaha)

Double-A (Northwest Arkansas)

High-A (Quad Cities)

Single-A (Columbia)

Rookie (Arizona)

Foreign Rookie (Dominican)

References

Minor league players
Lists of minor league baseball players